The Ogilvie Mountains are a mountain range in the Yukon Territory of northwestern Canada.

Geologically they are part of the Yukon Ranges, in the upper Laramide Belt of the North American Cordillera.

Geography
The range lies north of Dawson City, and is crossed by the Dempster Highway.

The area was first surveyed by William Ogilvie and the range subsequently named after him.

Sub-ranges
Nahoni Range

Peaks
The best known mountain peaks of the Ogilvie Mountains are located within Tombstone Territorial Park.

The range's most familiar mountains, with their jagged granite peaks, are:
 Tombstone Mountain
 Mount Monolith

References

External links

Canadian Mountain Encyclopedia: Ogilvie Mountains

Mountain ranges of Yukon
North American Cordillera